Richard Edwards (1842 – 29 October 1915) was an Australian politician. He was a Member of the Australian House of Representatives.

Early life 
Richard Edwards was born in 1842 in Montgomeryshire, Wales. He migrated to Australia in 1862, becoming first a goldminer in Victoria and then a shopkeeper in Brisbane. He invested in both sugar and newspapers.

Politics 
In the first federal election in 1901, Edwards was elected to the Australian House of Representatives as the member for Oxley. Although there was no protectionist organisation in Queensland, he described himself as such and sat with the Protectionist Party in Parliament. In 1906, he defected to the Anti-Socialist Party and, after the fusion of the Protectionist Party and the Anti-Socialist Party in 1909, he was a Liberal member.

Later life 
He retired from politics in 1913, due to ailing health, becoming a businessman, publisher and philanthropist.

Edwards died at his residence, "Bryntirion", on Wickham Terrace, on 29 October 1915. He was buried in Toowong Cemetery.

Legacy 
His drapery store, the Edwards and Chapman Building in Queen Street, Brisbane is now listed on the Queensland Heritage Register.

His residence, Bryntirion, is also listed on the Queensland Heritage Register.

References

Protectionist Party members of the Parliament of Australia
Free Trade Party members of the Parliament of Australia
Commonwealth Liberal Party members of the Parliament of Australia
Members of the Australian House of Representatives for Oxley
Members of the Australian House of Representatives
1842 births
1915 deaths
Burials at Toowong Cemetery
20th-century Australian politicians